Schmidt may refer to:

 Schmidt (surname), including list of people with the surname
 Schmidt (singer) (born 1990), German pop and jazz singer
 Schmidt (lunar crater), a small lunar impact crater
 Schmidt (Martian crater), a crater on Mars
 Schmidt (volcano), in Kamchatka
 Schmidt Block, listed on the National Register of Historic Places in Scott County, Iowa, USA
 Schmidt Brewery, a St. Paul brewery
 Schmidt camera, an astronomical telescope designed for photography
 Schmidt–Cassegrain telescope, a version of the Schmidt camera
 Schmidt Site, an archeological site in Michigan, USA, listed on the National Register of Historic Places in 1973
 Schmidt Spiele, a German games manufacturer
 Schmidt Baking Company, makers of Schmidt's Blue Ribbon Bread
 von Schmidt auf Altenstadt, a German baronial family in Kirchgattendorf, part of the municipality of Gattendorf
 Schmidt Island, an island in the Novaya Zemlya archipelago in the Arctic Ocean
 Schmidt Peninsula (Sakhalin), a peninsula at the northern tip of Sakhalin, Russia
 Schmidt Peninsula (Antarctica)
 Cape Schmidt, a cape on the coast of the Chukchi Sea, Russia, also known by its Russian name, Mys Shmidta
 Schmidt reaction
 Schmidt number
 Schmidt decomposition, a decomposition of vectors of tensor product spaces
 Schmidt sting pain index, a scalar index to the degree of pain from hymenoptera stings
 Schmidt (New Girl), a character on the television sitcom New Girl
 Schmidt hammer, a device to measure the elastic properties or strength of concrete or rock.

See also 
 Smith (surname)
 Schmitt (disambiguation)
 Schmit, a surname
 Schmitz
 Schmid
 Schmied
 Smits